Senokos is a village in the municipality of Dolneni, North Macedonia. It is located 11 kilometers northeast from Prilep. It is divided into three parts, and inhabited by Macedonians.

Demographics
According to the 2021 census, the village had a total of 271 inhabitants. Ethnic groups in the village include:

Macedonians: 268
Persons for whom data are taken from administrative sources: 2
Other: 1

Sports
The local football club is called Red Star FC.

References

}

Villages in Dolneni Municipality